Terry or Terri Thompson may refer to: 
 Terry Thompson (politician), member of the Missouri House of Representatives
 Terry J. Thompson, jockey  
 Terry Thompson, exotic animal owner responsible for the 2011 Zanesville, Ohio animal escape
 Terri Thompson, American business journalist 
Terri Thompson (curler), see 2014 Canadian Senior Curling Championships – Women's tournament